Barbro Carina Bergfeldt, (born 19 February 1980) is a Swedish journalist, reporter, columnist and author. Since March 2016 she is SVT's correspondent to Washington, D.C.

In 2012, Bergfeldt was awarded the Stora Journalistpriset in the category Storyteller of the Year for her report "Dagen vi aldrig glömmer" about the Utøya massacre in July 2011.

Bibliography
Bergfeldt, Carina (2012). Fadersmord. Stockholm: Frank. 
Rasismen i Sverige (anthology, 2014)
Bergfeldt, Carina (2015). Sju dagar kvar att leva. Stockholm: Norstedt. 
Bergfeldt, Carina (2015). Fotografiet. Bookmark Förlag.

References

Living people
1980 births
Swedish women writers
Swedish journalists
Place of birth missing (living people)